Madina Aliyeva is a ballerina, ballet choreographer, ballet-master, People's Artist of Azerbaijan (2002), personal grant-holder of the President of the Republic of Azerbaijan (2008). "Golden Dervish" and "Zirva" award laureate.

Activity
In 1999 she performed the character of the maiden, Gulyanag at the Maiden Tower (ballet) by Afrasiyab Badalbeyli.
In 2012, she constructed the dance at the opera "Così fan tutte" (Thus Do They All, or The School for Lovers) by Wolfgang Amadeus Mozart, staged in the Azerbaijan State Academic Opera and Ballet Theater.

In 2014, she was a ballet-maker of the ballet "One Thousand and One Nights" by Fikret Amirov, who was staged in Minsk, the capital of Belarus.

References

Living people
Ballet choreographers
Azerbaijani ballerinas
People's Artists of Azerbaijan
Year of birth missing (living people)